An expendable launch system (or expendable launch vehicle/ELV) is a launch vehicle that can be launched only once, after which its components are either destroyed during reentry or discarded in space. ELVs typically consist of several rocket stages that are discarded sequentially as their fuel is exhausted and the vehicle gains altitude and speed. As of 2022, most satellites and human spacecraft are currently launched on ELVs. ELVs are simpler in design than reusable launch systems and therefore may have a lower production cost. Furthermore, an ELV can use its entire fuel supply to accelerate its payload, offering greater payloads. ELVs are proven technology in widespread use for many decades.

ELVs are usable only once, and therefore have a significantly higher per-launch cost than modern (post-STS) reusable vehicles.

Current operators

Arianespace

China

ISRO

During the 1960s and 1970s, India initiated its own launch vehicle program in alignment with its geopolitical and economic considerations. In the 1960s–1970s, the country India started with a sounding rocket in the 1960s and 1970s and advanced its research to deliver the Satellite Launch Vehicle-3 and the more advanced Augmented Satellite Launch Vehicle (ASLV), complete with operational supporting infrastructure by the 1990s.

JAXA

Roscosmos

United States

Several governmental agencies of the United States purchase ELV launches. NASA is a major customer with the Commercial Resupply Services and Commercial Crew Development programs, also launching scientific spacecraft. The vast majority of launch vehicles for its missions, from the Redstone missile to the Delta, Atlas, Titan and Saturn rocket families, have been expendable. As its flagship crewed exploration replacement for the partially reusable Space Shuttle, NASA's newest ELV, the Space Launch System flew successfully in November 2022 after delays of more than six years. It is planned to serve in a major role on crewed exploration programs going forward.

The United States Air Force is also an ELV customer, having designed the Titan, Atlas, and Delta families. Both the Delta IV and Atlas V from the 1994 Evolved ELV (EELV) program remain in active service, operated by the United Launch Alliance. The National Security Space Launch (NSSL) competition has selected two EELV successors, the expendable Vulcan Centaur and partially reusable Falcon 9, to provide assured access to space.

Iranian Space Agency

Safir

Simorgh

Qoqnoos

Israel Space Agency

See also 

 Comparison of orbital launch systems
 Comparison of orbital launchers families
 Launch vehicle
 Lists of rockets
 Spacecraft propulsion
 Spaceflight

References

External links 
 ULA website
 Arianespace website
 ESA website
 Mitsubishi Heavy Industries website